The Executioners is the name of several tag teams and single masked wrestlers who wrestled in the BYWA, TWA, AWF and the World Wide Wrestling Federation.

The Executioners (1970s) 

The first version of Executioners was founded by Executioner #1, who was a masked wrestler, wrestling for World Wide Wrestling Federation. In 1976 he trained Executioner #2, and the two became a tag team in WWWF.

Together, the Executioners captured the WWWF Tag Team Championship on May 11, 1976 by defeating Louis Cerdan and Tony Parisi. Later, they were joined by a third masked wrestler who called himself Executioner #3.

The Executioners were stripped of their titles on December 7 because Executioner #3 was used in a title defense against Chief Jay Strongbow and Billy White Wolf. A three-team tournament was announced after Executioner #3 was unmasked as Nikolai Volkoff.

Volkoff selected Tor Kamata as his partner and then The Executioners & Nikolai Volkoff and Tor Kamata were defeated by Chief Jay Strongbow and Billy White Wolf in the three-team tournament.

Championships and accomplishments
 WWWF Tag Team Championship (1 time) - Executioner #1 & Executioner #2

List of wrestlers who wrestled as an Executioner

1976–1977 
 Killer Kowalski
 Big John Studd
 Nikolai Volkoff

1982 
 Ron Shaw
 Charley Rhoads

1985 
 Buddy Rose (at WrestleMania I)
 Charlie Fulton
 Danny Davis (later became Mr.X)

1986 
 Jerry Fazio
 Terry Manton

1988 
 Van Van Horne (Memphis)

1988–1994 
 Duane Gill
 Barry Hardy

1996 
 Terry Gordy

References

External links
 The Executioners Profile At OWW

Masked tag teams
Professional wrestling gimmicks
WWE teams and stables
WWE World Tag Team Champions